Novak Martinović (born 31 January 1985) is a Serbian professional footballer who plays as a defender for OFK Beograd.

Career
In his homeland, Martinović played for Rad, BSK Borča, OFK Beograd, and Smederevo, before moving abroad to Romania in early 2009. He is arguably best remembered for kicking a Petrolul Ploiești fan who ran onto the field and punched his Steaua București teammate George Galamaz in the head during a Liga I game in October 2011. Despite receiving a red card by the referee, Martinović was later praised for his reaction by the media and the fans.

In early 2013, Martinović was transferred to Chinese club Wuhan Zall. He left Asia after just six months and returned to Serbia to join Red Star Belgrade.

Honours
Steaua București
 Cupa României: 2010–11
Red Star Belgrade
 Serbian SuperLiga: 2013–14

References

External links
 
 

Association football defenders
Chinese Super League players
CS Pandurii Târgu Jiu players
Expatriate footballers in China
Expatriate footballers in Romania
FC Steaua București players
FC Steaua II București players
FK BSK Borča players
FK Rad players
FK Smederevo players
Liga I players
Liga II players
OFK Beograd players
Red Star Belgrade footballers
Serbian expatriate footballers
Serbian expatriate sportspeople in China
Serbian expatriate sportspeople in Romania
Serbian First League players
Serbian footballers
Serbian SuperLiga players
Footballers from Belgrade
Wuhan F.C. players
1985 births
Living people